Hot and Naked, also known as Thrill Seekers is a 1974 French erotic and action film directed by Guy Maria.

Plot

Cast
  : Karl 
 Jean-Michel Dhermay : Jimmy 
 Marie-Georges Pascal : Melanie (Mylène in French original version)
 Anne Kerylen : Lily (Liliane)
  : Camilla (Camille)
 Maurice Bataille : Le patron des cascadeurs

Releases
DVD
Released in 2007 in the US by Substance. (English dubbed)

References

External links
 

1974 films
1970s French-language films
French erotic films
1970s action films
French action films
1970s French films